is a Japan-exclusive action/cinematic soccer video game released in 1996 by Bandai for the PlayStation. The game is one of few to have two modes: a friendly match mode and a story mode in which you follow the plot of the actual anime.

Story Mode
The story line immediately skips to the junior World Cup grand final between Japan and Germany. During this first match, you are likely to learn that it is difficult to score against the German keeper, Deuter Müller. However, each time you finish a match no matter if it was a defeat or draw, your players gain experience points making the next retry easier.

After winning a number of games with Japan Junior, the focus changes to Shingo Aoi (葵新伍) in Italy just as it does in the anime. It later focuses back to Japan Junior (now part Japan Youth) in preparation for a match against Holland Youth.

While Tsubasa is away to Brazil to meet Roberto and join the Brazil League, the rest of Japan Youth members gets harsh trainings from their new coach Minato Gamo after Tatsuo Mikami's retirement, for a preparation in Asian League, until they got their fighting spirits back to overcome these harsh trainings once Tsubasa return to Japan. In the middle of Asian League against Thailand Youth, Shingo and Genzo Wakabayashi joins Japan Youth in its second round and able to win the match.

Unlike in anime, it has exclusive ending after the seven members of Japan Youth (namely Taro Misaki, Makoto Soda, Hiroshi Jito, Shun Nitta, the Tachibana twins and Kojiro Hyuga) were being given a proper training so they can be qualified to enter the Asian League, Japan Youth has a special match against the Dream Team (consist most well-known stars from different countries which Japan Junior/Youth previously faced against (Italy, Argentina, Germany, And Thailand)).

Player Levels
Each player can reach a maximum of level 100. Increasing a player's level boosts all his stats including speed, power, stamina, and shooting. Particular players will also learn special shots at certain levels. Note that each player's level corresponds only to one team and one mode. For example, Tsubasa Oozora (大空翼)'s level may not be the same when choosing Japan and Japan Junior. Be sure to save your data whether it is in story or friendly match mode.

References

Get In The Tomorrow
1996 video games
Association football video games
Bandai games
Japan-exclusive video games
PlayStation (console) games
PlayStation (console)-only games
Multiplayer and single-player video games
Video games developed in Japan